Rachel Elior (born 28 December 1949) is an Israeli professor of Jewish philosophy at the Hebrew University of Jerusalem in Jerusalem, Israel. Her principal subjects of research has been Hasidism and the history of early Jewish mysticism.

Academic career
Elior is the John and Golda Cohen Professor of Jewish Philosophy and Jewish Mystical Thought at the Hebrew University, where she has taught since 1978. Currently she is the head of the Department of Jewish Thought. She earned her PhD Summa cum laude in 1976. Her specialties are early Jewish Mysticism, the Dead Sea Scrolls, Hekhalot literature, Messianism, Sabbatianism, Hasidism, Chabad, Frankism and the role of women in Jewish culture.

She has been a visiting professor at Princeton University, UCL, Yeshiva University, the University of Tokyo, Doshisha University in Kyoto, Case Western Reserve University in Cleveland, in the University of Chicago and at the University of Michigan-Ann Arbor.

She is a member of the board of the international council of the New Israel Fund.

Awards and recognition
In 2006, Elior received the Gershom Scholem Prize for Research in Kabbalah from the Israel Academy of Sciences and Humanities.

Criticism and controversy

On her primary field of expertise, Hasidism, Yohanan Petrovsky-Shtern, Professor at Northwestern, states "Elior uses a rather outdated concept of the [hasidic] movement to cement her narrative. She leaves aside theories, ideas, insights, and data amassed by scholars who have long departed from the thinking patterns of Dinur or Scholem." And that Elior, among others, "should revisit [the early writers of hasidic stories'] conceptual framework, in which sources coexist in a nontemporal fashion and freely talk to one another, as ideas in the Platonic world of forms."

Dead Sea Scrolls
Her theory of the origins of mysticism in the priestly class has been challenged by Prof. Yehuda Liebes of the Hebrew University, and her understanding of the ancient calendar was rejected by Sacha Stern. Eibert Tigchelaar noted that her examples have a "lack of historical specificity that are disturbing and frustrating." She has been defended by Joseph Dan. Princeton professor Peter Schaefer says she blurs distinctions between texts and periods, and is not sensitive to important nuances. He also notes that her views of angels at Qumran and the calendar are wrong. Prof Martha Himmelfarb finds Elior's work "simply untenable". Himmelfarb says that Elior creates tenuous links, historical connections without a basis, and sees things that just are "not there."

Elior claims that the Essenes, the supposed authors of the Dead Sea Scrolls never existed.  She contends (as have Lawrence Schiffman, Moshe Goshen-Gottstein, Chaim Menachem Rabin, and others) that the Essenes were really the renegade sons of Zadok, a priestly caste banished from the Temple of Jerusalem by Greek rulers in 2nd century BC. She conjectures that the scrolls were taken with them when they were banished. "In Qumran, the remnants of a huge library were found," Elior says, with some of the early Hebrew texts dating back to the 2nd century BC. Until the discovery of the Dead Sea Scrolls, the earliest known version of the Old Testament dated back to the 9th century AD. "The scrolls attest to a biblical priestly heritage," says Elior, who speculates that the scrolls were hidden in Qumran for safekeeping.

James Charlesworth, director of the Dead Sea Scrolls Project and professor at Princeton Theological Seminary, said there is "significant evidence for the Essenes’ existence" and "It is impossible that Josephus created a group already mentioned by Philo, who had visited Jerusalem." Princeton religion professor Martha Himmelfarb said she doesn’t think Elior’s work is as "historically informed" as other research on the Scrolls, saying, "[Elior] does not tend to engage the historical nitty-gritty that other scholars’ work does."
-->

See also 
 Moshe Idel
 Ada Rapoport-Albert

References

Bibliography
 Israel Ba'al Shem Tov and his Contemporaries, Kabbalists, Sabbatians, Hasidim and Mithnagdim, Jerusalem : Carmel Publication House 2014
 Memory and Oblivion: The Secret of the Dead Sea Scrolls,  Van Leer Institute and Hakibutz haMeuchad, 2009 
 The Dybbuk and Jewish Women, Jerusalem and New York, Urim Publications, 2008
 
 
 Heikhalot Literature and Merkavah Tradition Ancient Jewish Mysticism and its Sources, Tel Aviv: Yediot Ahronot; Sifrei Hemed: 2004 (Hebrew) 
 
 Herut al Haluhot – Studies in the Mystical Foundations of Hasidism, Tel Aviv: Broad Cast University: Defense Ministry Press 1999.
 Paneiah ha-Shonot shel ha-Herut -Iyunim be-Mistika Yehudit (Alpayim 15, Am Oved 1998)
 
 Torat HaElohut BaDor haSheni shel Hasidut Habad, Jerusalem: Hebrew University: Magnes Press 1982 (Hebrew)
 Heikhalot Zutarti: An Early Mystical Manuscript of the Mishnaic Talmudic Period, Jerusalem: Hebrew University: Magnes Press 1982 (Hebrew)
 Galia Raza: 16th Century Kabbalistic Manuscript, Jerusalem: Hebrew University 1981 (Hebrew)
 Yehudah Liebes, "Children of the sun vs. children of the moon" Haaretz 4/6/2003
 Sacha Stern, "Rachel Elior on Ancient Jewish Calendars: A Critique" Aleph: Historical Studies in Science and Judaism - Volume 5, 2005, pp. 287–292
 Peter Schaffer, Critical edition of Heikhalot Zutarti, Tarbiz 54 (1985)Hebrew, critical review of her work
 David Tamar, Critical review of her edition of Galia Razia Jerusalem Studies in Jewish Thought 2 Hebrew (1983)

External links
 Facebook page
 Prof. Elior's homepage at the Hebrew University
 Dead Sea Scrolls’ origins spark debate
 

1949 births
Living people
Dead Sea Scrolls
Academic staff of the Hebrew University of Jerusalem
Historians of Jews and Judaism
Israeli women academics
Israeli Jews
Jewish historians
Jewish mysticism
Jewish women writers
Kabbalah
Philosophers of Judaism